The  Milwaukee Mustangs season was the fourth season for the franchise, and the third in the Arena Football League (AFL). The team was coached by Bob Landsee and played their home games at BMO Harris Bradley Center. The Mustangs finished the season 5–13 and did not qualify for the playoffs. Following this season, the Mustangs announced that they would suspend operations for 2013, with the hope of returning to play in 2014.

Standings

Schedule
The Mustangs had a bye week during the season's opening week, and began the season on the road in week 2 against the Arizona Rattlers on March 17. Their first home game was on March 29 when they hosted the Pittsburgh Power. They finished the regular season on the road against the Orlando Predators.

Final roster

References

Milwaukee Mustangs
Milwaukee Mustangs (2009–2012) seasons